Moilanen is a Finnish surname. Notable people with the surname include:

 Kaapro Moilanen (1878–1957), Finnish schoolteacher, journalist and politician
 Louis Moilanen (1886–1913), Finnish-born giant
 Tepi Moilanen (born 1973), Finnish professional footballer
 Janne Moilanen (born 1978), Finnish footballer
 Ville Moilanen (born 1999), Finnish professional footballer

Finnish-language surnames